Kharlton Belmar (born December 1, 1992) is a professional footballer who plays as a forward for Richmond Kickers in USL League One. Born in the United States, he represents the Grenada national team.

Career

College and amateur
Belmar spent his entire college career at Virginia Commonwealth University. He made a total of 76 appearances for the Rams and tallied 18 goals and five assists.

He also played in the Premier Development League for Mississippi Brilla and Portland Timbers U23s.

Professional

Portland Timbers 2
On January 15, 2015, Belmar was selected in the second round (34th overall) of the 2015 MLS SuperDraft by the Portland Timbers.  However, he was cut from camp and he ended up signing with USL affiliate club Portland Timbers 2.  On March 29, he made his professional debut for the club and scored twice in a 3–1 victory over Real Monarchs SLC.

On October 1, 2015, Belmar was signed by the Cosmos on a short-term loan deal from Timbers 2.

Sporting Kansas City/Swope Park Rangers
Belmar moved to USL side Swope Park Rangers on December 19, 2016. On September 15, 2017, Belmar earned a move to Swope Park's Major League Soccer parent club Sporting Kansas City. He made his debut as a late substitute against the Houston Dynamo on October 11, 2017.

Nashville SC
After his option was declined by Sporting Kansas City at the end of their 2018 season, Belmar signed with USL Championship side Nashville SC ahead of their 2019 season.

Sacramento Republic
On December 12, 2019, Belmar moved to USL Championship side Sacramento Republic ahead of their 2020 season. Belmar was released by Sacramento following the 2021 season.

Colorado Springs Switchbacks
Belmar joined Colorado Springs Switchbacks FC on December 28, 2021.

Richmond Kickers
On February 9, 2023, Belmar signed with USL League One side Richmond Kickers.

International career
Belmar was born in the United States and is of Grenadian descent. He was called up to represent the Grenada national team on 16 March 2021. On 25 March, he made his international debut for Grenada in a World Cup qualifier against El Salvador.

References

External links
VCU Rams bio

1992 births
Living people
Sportspeople from Virginia Beach, Virginia
Grenadian footballers
Grenada international footballers
American soccer players
American people of Grenadian descent
Sportspeople of Grenadian descent
Association football forwards
Major League Soccer players
Colorado Springs Switchbacks FC players
Mississippi Brilla players
Nashville SC (2018–19) players
National Premier Soccer League players
New York Cosmos (2010) players
North American Soccer League players
Portland Timbers draft picks
Portland Timbers U23s players
Portland Timbers 2 players
Richmond Kickers players
RVA FC players
Sacramento Republic FC players
Soccer players from Virginia Beach
Sporting Kansas City players
Sporting Kansas City II players
USL Championship players
USL League One players
USL League Two players
VCU Rams men's soccer players